The 2018 Festival Luxembourgeois du cyclisme féminin Elsy Jacobs was a women's cycle stage race that was held in Luxembourg from 27 to 29 April 2018. The 2018 edition of the race was the 11th running of the Festival Elsy Jacobs, being held with a UCI rating of 2.1.

Teams
A total of 20 teams competed in the race, including 15 UCI Women's Teams.

Route

Classification leadership table

See also
2018 in women's road cycling

References

2018 in women's road cycling